Datha is a town and former non-salute Rajput princely state on Saurashtra peninsula in Gujarat, western India.

The village lies on the Bagad river, in Kathiawar.

History 
The princely state, in Gohelwar prant, was ruled by Sarvaiya Rajput Chieftains.

In 1901 it comprised 24 villages, covering 69 square km, with a population of 9,452, yielding 31,339 Rupees state revenue (1903-4, mostly from land), and paid 5,398 Rupees tribute, to the Gaikwar Baroda State and Junagadh State.

References

External links and Sources 
 Imperial Gazetteer, on DSAL.UChicago.edu - Kathiawar

Princely states of Gujarat
Rajput princely states